Greg Miller is an American animator, cartoonist, and storyboard artist. His art style is based on the animation style of Schoolhouse Rock!, which was used in his own television series, Whatever Happened to... Robot Jones?, airing on Cartoon Network from 2002 to 2003 and his short film, The Wizzard of Krudd, a canceled Nickelodeon short featuring the voice of Devon Workheiser as the protagonist. He worked on the production of Shrek the Third and Monsters vs. Aliens as the additional storyboard artist. His recent credits include being a storyboard artist, writer, animator, and character designer on Secret Mountain Fort Awesome, Gravity Falls, and Uncle Grandpa.

Early life and education

Miller grew up in Upper St. Clair, Pennsylvania near Pittsburgh. He graduated from Upper St. Clair High School in 1992 and went on to attend the University of the Arts in Philadelphia.  While there, he earned an internship at Hanna-Barbera that would eventually lead him to drop out of college after receiving a job offer to work on Dexter's Laboratory.

Career

Miller began his career at Hanna-Barbera as a writer and storyboard artist for Dexter's Laboratory which aired on Cartoon Network. He also later worked on Cow and Chicken and The Powerpuff Girls as a member of the production company. In between stints at Hanna-Barbera, he worked for Nickelodeon (on CatDog and The Angry Beavers) and at Disney (on Nightmare Ned).

While working at Hanna-Barbera, he pitched the company a new show called Whatever Happened to... Robot Jones?. Hanna-Barbera declined, prompting Miller to take the pitch directly to Cartoon Network. Cartoon Network purchased the pilot along with the pilots of 9 other shows with the intent of trying them all out over one summer. Cartoon Network executives chose 3 (including Robot Jones) to be voted on by viewers in August 2000 in an event known as The Big Pick or Big Pick Weekend. Robot Jones received 23% of the vote, finishing second and losing out to The Grim Adventures of Billy & Mandy created by Maxwell Atoms.

Filmography

Film

Television

References

External links

American animators
American animated film directors
American art directors
Film producers from Pennsylvania
American male composers
21st-century American composers
American male screenwriters
American storyboard artists
American television directors
Television producers from Pennsylvania
American television writers
Background artists
People from Pittsburgh
Year of birth missing (living people)
Living people
Hanna-Barbera people
American male television writers
American voice directors
Film directors from Pennsylvania
Screenwriters from Pennsylvania
21st-century American male musicians
Cartoon Network Studios people